Dowgate, also referred to as Downgate and Downegate, is a small ward in the City of London, the historic and financial centre of London. The ward is bounded to the east by Swan Lane and Laurence Poutney Lane, to the south by the River Thames, to the west by Cousin Lane and College Hill, and to the north by Cannon Street. It is where the "lost" Walbrook watercourse emptied into the Thames.

A number of City livery companies are quartered in the ward: the Worshipful Company of Dyers, Worshipful Company of Innholders, Worshipful Company of Skinners and Worshipful Company of Tallow Chandlers. There is one church, St. Michael Paternoster, where, in addition to its local and congregational causes, the Anglican Mission to Seafarers convenes and fundraises. The ward also contains Cannon Street station, which is on the site of the Steelyard (a mediaeval trading port of the Hanseatic League), and Dowgate Fire Station on Upper Thames Street, the only London Fire Brigade station within the City of London.

Politics
Dowgate is one of the 25 wards of the City of London, each electing an alderman to the Court of Aldermen and  commoners (the City equivalent of a councillor) to the Court of Common Council of the City of London Corporation. Only electors who are Freemen of the City of London are eligible to stand.

Notes

References

Bibliography
Betjeman, J, The City of London Churches, Andover, Pitkin, 1972

External links
Corporation of London - present day map of Dowgate ward
Vintry and Dowgate Wards Club
City of London police
Alison Gowman, Alderman of Dowgate Ward
 Map of Early Modern London: Dowgate Ward - Historical Map and Encyclopedia of Shakespeare's London (Scholarly)

Wards of the City of London